Moga railway station is located in Moga district in the Indian state of  Punjab and serves Moga city.

The railway station
The station consists of two platforms. The platforms  are not well sheltered. It lacks many facilities including water and sanitation. The station serves Ludhiana–Fazilka line.

References

Railway stations in Moga district
Firozpur railway division
Moga, Punjab